Carla Carolina Moreira Diaz (born 28 November 1990) is a Brazilian actress and singer.

Career 
She began her career in 1992 with only two years old, doing television commercials where, overall, did about 80 commercials. In soap opera debuted in 1994 where she played Eliana, Éramos Seis, and in 1996 came to prominence as the sweet Tininha Colégio Brasil, both of SBT. In 1997 she became known nationally when acting in the end of first season of the novel Chiquititas Brasil as little Maria, where she stayed for four seasons, leaving in 1999.

In 2000 she moved to Rede Globo, where she joined the soap opera Laços de Família like sweet Raquel, but it was in 2001 that has established itself as an actress in O Clone incarnated where Khadija Rachid, daughter of the protagonist Jade (Giovanna Antonelli). In 2003 she played Angélica in the miniseries A Casa das Sete Mulheres, a small guerrilla daughter of one of the seven protagonists. In 2004 Carla was the presenter of the Best of the Year Award Austregésilo de Athayde, the Academia Brasileira de Letras. In the following years starred in the Sítio do Picapau Amarelo, as temperamental Cléo, and A Grande Família, as Beatriz.

In 2007 Carla faced one of her toughest jobs in Sete Pecados, where Gina played the orphan, victim of bullying at school for being a carrier of HIV, suffering beatings and humiliations. In February 2009, she signed a contract with Rede Record, entering the trilogy Os Mutantes, the third stage Promessas de Amor, where she plays co-protagonist Juno. In 2011 she joined the cast of Rebelde, as the mysterious Márcia. In 2014, she plays the black bloc journalist, Lucrécia, in the political miniseries Plano Alto. Her last character on RecordTV was Princess Melina in A Terra Prometida.

In June 2011, Carla made a sensual rehearsal for the VIP men's magazine. In 2016, she debuted like a singer participating in the single "Voa" of Bernardo Falcone.

In August 2017, returns to Rede Globo to live Carine, in the novel of the 21 hours, A Força do Querer.

In January 2021, it was announced she is a contestant in the reality show Big Brother Brasil 21.

Filmography

Television

Film

Internet

Theater

References

External links 
 

1990 births
Living people
People from São Paulo
Actresses from São Paulo
Brazilian people of Uruguayan descent
Brazilian child actresses
Brazilian telenovela actresses
Brazilian film actresses
Brazilian stage actresses
20th-century Brazilian actresses
21st-century Brazilian actresses
Big Brother (franchise) contestants
Big Brother Brasil